Anathallis graveolens is a species of orchid.

References 

graveolens